Rupert Holliday-Evans (also Rupert Holliday Evans) is an English actor. He is well known for his roles in programmes such as the ITV police drama The Bill and CBBC children's programmes The Giblet Boys and Powers. In episodes of comedy sketch show Harry Enfield's Television Programme he played one of the Double-Take Brothers. He recently played the role of Colonel Mace in the Doctor Who two-part episodes "The Sontaran Stratagem" and "The Poison Sky". He attended Bishop Luffa C of E School in Chichester, West Sussex.

Filmography
The Bill (8 episodes 1990–2007) as Larry Franks
Bergerac (1990) "There for the Picking", 1990 Christmas Special, as Baz
A Touch of Frost (1995) Series 3 episode 1 as Richard Martin
Pie in the Sky (1996 episode "Gary's Cake") as DS Stringer
84 Charing Cross Road (1987) as Party Guest
Hornblower (1998) as Steward
Cider with Rosie (1998) as Deserter
Dirty Rotten Scoundrels (1988) as English Sailor # 1
Second Sight (2000) as DC Pewsey
Powers (2004) as Professor Henry Powers
The Giblet Boys (2005) as "Dad"
Doctor Who (2008 episodes "The Sontaran Stratagem" and "The Poison Sky") as Colonel Mace
Skins (2008 episode 10 "Everyone")
My Family (2009) as an MI5 Officer
Midsomer Murders (2010) episode "The Silent Land" as Adam Peach
EastEnders (21 September – 2 October 2015) as Jury Foreman
Patrick (2018) as Mr. Peters
Father Brown (2019) Season 7 Episode 2: "The Passing Bell" as Mervyn Glossop
Muse (2019) as The Bailiff 
Six Minutes to Midnight (2020) as Band Leader
 Doctors (2 March 2021) as Bob Wainwright
 Nemesis (2021) as Lewis
Showtrial (October 2021) as Brian Reeves

References

External links

Living people
People educated at Bishop Luffa School
Year of birth missing (living people)